Noah Shepard is a former American football quarterback. He played college football at South Dakota. Shepard was signed by the Green Bay Packers as an undrafted free agent in 2010.

College career
Shepard was a four-year starter at South Dakota. He finished his career as the most decorated passer in Coyotes history with school records in passing yards (8,936), passing touchdowns (77) and total offense (11,133). His 36 rushing touchdowns ranks second in school history.

Professional career
After going undrafted in the 2010 NFL Draft, Shepard signed with the Green Bay Packers on April 30, 2010. On July 18, 2010, he was released by the Packers.

References

External links
Green Bay Packers official site - Noah Shepard, archived on 2010-05-07

Living people
American football quarterbacks
South Dakota Coyotes football players
1986 births
Green Bay Packers players